Nong Nooch Tropical Botanical Garden is a  botanical garden and tourist attraction at kilometer 163 on Sukhumvit Road in Chonburi Province, Thailand. It can be reached via bus, taxi or private land transportation. It is also a major scientific center dedicated to cycads, with its own Cycad Gene Bank.

History
Pisit and Nongnooch Tansacha purchased the  plot of land in 1954 with the intention of developing the land as a fruit plantation. However, the owners instead decided to plant tropical flowers and plants as a wildlife conservation project. The garden opened to the public in 1980, and management was transferred to Pisit and Nongnooch's son Kampon Tansacha in 2001.
ديقة ( Nong Nooch ) النباتية

Activities
In addition to examining the wildlife, tourists experience religious ceremonies, martial arts demonstrations, massages, and elephant shows. In 2019, controversy ensued when a tourist uploaded images that suggested mistreatment of the elephants in their care, an accusation the Botanical Gardens has disputed.

There are also two restaurants, a small zoo and a hotel with a swimming pool and Thai style rental houses on the grounds.

Garden divisions
French Garden
European Garden
Stonehenge Garden
Cactus & Succulent Garden
Variegated Plants 
Ant Tower
Butterfly Hill
Orchid & Bromeliad Display Garden
Flower valley

Cactus
Echinocactus grusonii (Mexican golden barrel cactus)
Echinopsis
Lobivia

Cycads
The garden focus on Southeast Asian, Tropical American and Central Africa species of Cycads, but a collection of almost every species can also been seen here.
In connection with conservation agencies the garden's cycad collections serve as an important ex situ conservation site for this endangered and ancient plant group.
On-going and continuing research at the garden concerning taxonomy and horticultural use has increased the knowledge about this plant group worldwide.

The Cycad genebank is managed by Anders J. Lindstrom, an expert in cycads.

Palms
Rhapis palms

Succulents
Blue Agave
Madagascar Euphorbia
Pachypodium

Zingiberales
Heliconia
Ginger
Torch Ginger
Alpinia

Other notable plant groups
Bougainvillea
Hoya
Bromeliads
Marantaceae
Passiflora
Plumeria
New Caledonian Plants

Gallery

External links

Nong Nooch Tropical Garden

Botanical gardens in Thailand
Geography of Chonburi province
Tourist attractions in Chonburi province
1980 establishments in Thailand